Central Moravia (Střední Morava) is an area of the Czech Republic defined by the Republic's Nomenclature of Territorial Units for Statistics, level NUTS 2. It is formed by the Olomouc Region and Zlín Region. It covers an area of 9 231 km2 and 1,219,394 inhabitants (population density 133 inhabitants/km2).

Economy 
The Gross domestic product (GDP) of the region was 19.3 billion € in 2018, accounting for 9.3% of Czech economic output. GDP per capita adjusted for purchasing power was 22,400 € or 74% of the EU27 average in the same year. The GDP per employee was 70% of the EU average.

See also
NUTS of the Czech Republic

References

NUTS 2 statistical regions of the European Union
Subdivisions of the Czech Republic